In enzymology, a carnosine N-methyltransferase is an enzyme that catalyzes the chemical reaction

S-adenosyl-L-methionine + carnosine  S-adenosyl-L-homocysteine + anserine

Thus, the two substrates of this enzyme are S-adenosyl methionine and carnosine, whereas its two products are S-adenosylhomocysteine and anserine.

This enzyme belongs to the family of transferases, specifically those transferring one-carbon group methyltransferases.  The systematic name of this enzyme class is S-adenosyl-L-methionine:carnosine N-methyltransferase. This enzyme participates in histidine metabolism.

Gene 
The genes encoding carnosine N-methyltransferase activity have been identified by Jakub Drozak and coworkers in 2013 and 2015. In birds and reptiles, the enzyme is encoded by histamine N-methyltransferase-like gene (HNMT-like). Importantly, the HNMT-like gene is absent from available mammalian genomes and in mammalian species, the formation of anserine is catalyzed by methyltransferase that is unrelated to the reptilian and avian enzyme and encoded by C9orf41/UPF0586 gene.

Protein Nomenclature 
Currently, the avian-reptilian enzyme encoded by HNMT-like gene is labeled as carnosine N-methyltransferase 2 in public databases, while the mammalian methyltransferase is named carnosine N-methyltransferase 1 (CARNMT1).

References

Further reading 

 

EC 2.1.1
Enzymes of unknown structure